Vecumnieki Municipality is a former municipality in Semigallia, Latvia. The municipality was formed in 2009 by merging Bārbele parish, Kurmene parish, Skaistkalne parish, Stelpe parish, Valle parish and Vecumnieki parish; the administrative centre being Vecumnieki. The population in 2020 was 7,665.

On 1 July 2021, Vecumnieki Municipality ceased to exist and its territory was merged with Bauska Municipality.

Population

Culture 
Since 2006 every year in July Vecumnieki county hosts a nation-wide Lily festival with exhibition of lilies, competition among florists and other cultural events and activities.

Notable countrymen 
  (1875—1953), musician and diplomat. First violinist of the Court Orchestra of the Russian Empire (1902-1917), Ambassador of Latvia to Belgium and Luxembourg (from 1929)
  (1885–1966), actor, director and performing arts teacher
 Arnolds Spekke (1887-1972), philologist, historian, diplomat.
  (born 1939), sculptor
 Ingmārs Līdaka (born 1966), zoologist and politician.

See also 
 Administrative divisions of Latvia (2009)

References 

 
Former municipalities of Latvia